William Darby was an Anglican Archdeacon in Ireland in the late 18th century.

Magee was educated at Trinity College Dublin. He was Sacrist of Clonfert Cathedral  and Archdeacon of Kilmacduagh from 1788 until his death in 1791.

References

Alumni of Trinity College Dublin
Archdeacons of Kilmacduagh
18th-century Irish Anglican priests
1791 deaths